The 1997 MAC Championship Game was the inaugural conference championship game of the Mid-American Conference, and was played on December 5, 1997, at Marshall Stadium, now known as Joan C. Edwards Stadium, in Huntington, West Virginia. The game featured the Marshall Thundering Herd of the East Division, and the Toledo Rockets of the West Division. It snowed the entire game. The Thundering Herd defeated the Rockets 34–14.

Teams

Toledo

Toledo entered the championship game as West Division champions, having compiled a 9–2 record, 7–1 record in MAC play. The Rockets started the season 8–0 and reaching No. 18 in the AP Poll before losing to Ball State for its only conference loss.

Marshall

Marshall entered the championship game as East Division champions, having compiled a 9–2 record, 7–1 record in MAC play.. After losing its season-opener to West Virginia, the Thundering Herd won nine of its next ten games. This marked Marshall's first season back in the MAC since it was suspended from the conference after the 1968 season.

Game summary

Statistics

References

Championship Game
MAC Championship Game
Marshall Thundering Herd football games
Toledo Rockets football games
December 1997 sports events in the United States
MAC Championship